A partial solar eclipse occurred on Thursday, October 23, 2014, with a magnitude of 0.81141. A solar eclipse occurs when the Moon passes between Earth and the Sun, thereby totally or partly obscuring the image of the Sun for a viewer on Earth. A partial solar eclipse occurs in the polar regions of the Earth when the center of the Moon's shadow misses the Earth. Occurring only 5.7 days after apogee (Apogee on October 18, 2014), the Moon's apparent diameter was smaller.

It was the 9th eclipse of the 153rd Saros cycle, which began with a partial eclipse on July 28, 1870 and will conclude with a partial eclipse on August 22, 3114.

Viewing 
The center of the Moon's shadow missed the Earth, passing above the North Pole, but a partial eclipse was visible at sunrise (October 24 local time) in far eastern Russia, and before sunset (October 23) across most of North America.

Gallery

Related eclipses

Eclipses of 2014 
 A total lunar eclipse on April 15.
 A non-central annular solar eclipse on April 29.
 A total lunar eclipse on October 8.
 A partial solar eclipse on October 23.

Solar eclipses 2011–2014

A total solar eclipse on March 20, 2015, and a partial solar eclipse of September 13, 2015 occur during the next lunar year set.

Metonic series

Notes

References

External links 

 Nontechnical information at NASA SSERVI
Sunspots and Solar Eclipse APOD 10/25/2014

2014 in science
2014 10 23
2014 10 23
October 2014 events